The key political players in Goa state in Western India are the Bharatiya Janata Party, Indian National Congress, Aam Aadmi Party, Maharashtrawadi Gomantak Party, Goa Forward Party and  Revolutionary Goans Party. It also has the presence of Nationalist Congress Party, Shiv Sena and Trinamool Congress.

National politics
There are only 2 Lok Sabha (lower house of the Indian Parliament) constituencies in Goa.

State politics
The Goa Legislative Assembly has 40 seats.

See also
 Goa Legislative Assembly

References